Gostkowski (feminine: Gostkowska) is a Polish-language surname, may refer to:
Rajmund Gostkowski :pl:Rajmund Gostkowski (1885-1966), an archaeologist 
Roman Gostkowski :pl:Roman Gostkowski (1837-1912), a railway engineer, professor 
Stephen Gostkowski (born 1984), an American football player
Wincenty Gostkowski (1807-1884), a lawyer and watchmaker
Wojciech Gostkowski :pl:Wojciech Gostkowski, 17th century mercantilism economist
Zofia Moraczewska née Gostkowska (1873–1958), a Polish politician and women's rights activist.

See also 
Gostkowo

Polish-language surnames